Yağmurpınar is a village in the Yedisu District, Bingöl Province, Turkey. The village is populated by Kurds of the Botikan tribe and had a population of 48 in 2021.

The hamlet of Angig mezrası is attached to the village.

References 

Villages in Yedisu District
Kurdish settlements in Bingöl Province